Hoffleit is a surname. Notable people with the surname include: 

Dorrit Hoffleit (1907-2007), American astronomer
Renate Hoffleit (born 1950), German sculptor and artist